Meg of Abernethy (1355–1405) was a Scottish musician. She was a harper at the royal court. She is the earliest female harper known in her country.

References 
 The Biographical Dictionary of Scottish Women (Hardcover) by Elizabeth L. Ewan, Sue Innes
 "A procession of notable Scottish women through time" kosmoid.net
 Tree of strings. Keith Sanger, Alison Kinnaird. Kinmor Music, 1992

14th-century Scottish people
15th-century Scottish people
14th-century Scottish women
15th-century Scottish women
British harpsichordists